The banknotes of the Yugoslav dinar were several series of paper money printed by the central bank of the different consecutive states named Yugoslavia (Kingdom of Yugoslavia, Socialist Federal Republic of Yugoslavia and Federal Republic of Yugoslavia).

1919 dinar 
The first dinar banknotes printed by the Kingdom of Serbs, Croats and Slovenes were ½, 1, 5, 10, 20, 100 and 1000 dinar banknotes printed in 1919. They were the continuation of the pre-WWI Serbian dinar and had the same value. The banknotes were overstamped with the value in Austro-Hungarian krone (Serbo-croatian: Kruna) to make the conversion easier (in the rate 1 dinar = 4 krone). Some ½ and 1 dinar banknotes were issued before the overstamping started, so they had no krone value stamped. The stamp on the 1 dinar = 4 krone banknote had a printing error: instead of the Cyrillic text "4 КРУНЕ", the text read "4 КУРНЕ".

1920 dinar 
The first dinar note was the ¼ dinara (25 para) note issued in 1921 by the Ministry of the Finances of the Kingdom of Serbs, Croats and Slovenes. Starting in 1922, the National Bank of the Kingdom of Serbs, Croats and Slovenes issued notes for 10, 100 and 1,000 dinara. The 10 dinara note was engraved and printed by the American Bank Note Company. In 1926 the design of the 10 dinara bill was changed.

Following the change of the country's name to Yugoslavia in 1929, the bank notes changed as well. New 10 dinara notes were printed that were the same as the old ones with a changed name and a new design of 100 dinara note was issued. In the following years each, other denominations were redesigned, including the 1,000 dinara notes in 1931 and 500 dinara notes in 1935.

1944 dinar 
In 1944, the Democratic Federation of Yugoslavia issued notes for 1, 5, 10, 20, 50, 100, 500 and 1,000 dinara.

1946 dinar

These were followed in 1946 by notes of the National Bank of the Federal People's Republic for 50, 100, 500 and 1,000 dinara. New 100 banknote was issued in 1953. The new banknotes were issued in 1955 for 100, 500, 1,000 and 5,000 dinara.

Two series of 1946 dinar banknotes were printed, but never issued. One was the "reserve" series with the printing date of 1950 that was made up of 10 banknotes: 1, 2, 5, 10, 20, 50, 100, 500, 1000 and 5000 dinara. It was kept for emergency purposes, but was never issued to circulation. All banknotes were eventually destroyed in the middle 1970s. Another is a series of six banknotes (10, 20, 50, 100, 1000 and 5000 dinara) with the printing dates of 1949, 1950 and 1951. It was probably intended as a replacement for the 1946 series (and 10-20 dinara banknotes from the 1944 series that were still in circulation), but was never issued to circulation. The 100 dinara banknote from this series was slightly altered and issued in 1954 with the printed date of  1 May 1953 (see above).

1965 dinar 
1965 saw the first revaluation of the dinar since the World War II.

In 1965, banknotes were introduced in denominations of 5, 10, 50 and 100 dinara. They used the same obverse design as the 1955 notes. 500 dinara notes were added in 1970, followed by 20 and 1,000 dinara in 1974. 5,000 dinara notes featuring a portrait of the late President Josip Broz Tito were added in 1985. As inflation worsened into hyperinflation, banknotes for 20,000 dinara were introduced in 1987, followed by 50,000 dinara in 1988 and 100,000, 500,000, 1,000,000 and 2,000,000 dinara in 1989. The 500,000 and 2,000,000 dinara notes were unusual in that they did not feature a portrait but an image of the monument on Kozara.

1990 dinar 
In 1990, notes were introduced for 10, 50, 100, 200, 500 and 1,000 dinara, some of which had designs very similar to those used for the corresponding notes of the previous currency. In 1991, 5,000 dinara notes were added.

1992 dinar 
In 1992, notes for 100, 500, 1000, 5000, 10,000 and 50,000 dinara were introduced in the Federal Republic of Yugoslavia. Again, designs modified from the previous series of notes were used but this time not in order that notes of equal value had similar designs. In 1993, owing to hyperinflation, the higher value notes were introduced for 100,000, 500,000, 1,000,000, 5,000,000, 10,000,000, 50,000,000, 100,000,000, 500,000,000, 1,000,000,000 and 10,000,000,000 dinara.

1993 dinar 
In 1993, banknotes for this currency were issued in denominations of 5000, 10,000, 50,000, 500,000, 5,000,000, 50,000,000, 500,000,000, 5,000,000,000, 50,000,000,000 and 500,000,000,000 dinara. The unusual sequence of denominations is a result of the hyperinflation that Yugoslavia was suffering from.

1994 dinar 
In January 1994, notes were issued for 10, 100, 1,000, 5,000, 50,000, 100,000, 500,000 and 10,000,000 dinara. Owing to hyperinflation, they circulated just for a couple of weeks before the currency was abandoned in favour of the novi dinar, pegged to the Deutsche Mark as it was used parallel with dinar. Novi dinar's peg to DM lasted until 1996 when the National Bank of Yugoslavia moved to floating exchange rate. 10 and 100 dinara notes were characteristic for lack of serial number on them.

Novi dinar

1994 series
On 24 January 1994, notes were introduced for 1, 5 and 10 novih (new) dinara. A second series of notes was introduced later in the year for 5, 10 and 20 novih dinara, with 50 novih dinara note added in 1996 and 100 novih dinara in 1997.

2000 series
In 2000, new notes without the word "novih" were issued in denominations of 20, 50 and 100 dinara. 10, 200 and 1,000 dinara notes were introduced in 2001, followed by 5,000 dinara in 2002.

Beginning in 2003, banknotes of the (re-established) National Bank of Serbia were introduced. These banknotes use almost the same design as the 2000–2002 Yugoslav notes. The main difference is that the words Narodna Banka Jugoslavije (National Bank of Yugoslavia) are changed to Narodna Banka Srbije (National Bank of Serbia) and the coat of arms of Serbia and Montenegro is changed to the Serbian coat of arms.
Banknotes released by the national bank of Yugoslavia between 2000 and 2002 were withdrawn from circulation on 1 January 2007.

References 

 
 
 Yugoslavia n banknotes at Infotech 2003
 Ron Wise's Banknoteworld: Yugoslavia

External links 

 Historical banknotes from Yugoslavia (1968-1991) 
 Historical banknotes from Yugoslavia (1992-1993) 
 Historical banknotes from Yugoslavia (1994-1999) 

Banknotes of Europe